Underpants Thief is a 2021 Sri Lankan Sinhalese adult drama film directed by Somaratne Dissanayake and produced by Renuka Balasooriya. It stars Pubudu Chathuranga and Dilhani Ekanayake in lead roles along with Chinthaka Kulathunga and Buddhi Randeniya. Music composed by Rohana Weerasinghe.

The film has been granted permission to screen with 'adults only' certification by the Public Performance Control Board. The media screening was held in early December 2021 at the Savoy Premier Cinema. The film was screened in overseas in 2017, where the film was officially screened in Sri Lanka on 23 December 2021. It is reported that the movie was screened last weekend in cinemas in Nugegoda, Maharagama and Matara with Housefull banner, such incident occurred after four years. Arrangements have been made to book a 9:30 pm screening for the film due to huge Housefull incidents throughout the country.

Plot
The story revolves around the character of a man with a less spoken mental condition, Sam (played by Pubudu), He is a man who steals and keeps women's panties. His brother's wife Nayani (played by Dilhani) is persecuted for behaving like her husband's younger brother sexually abused. But she gets used to it and takes the initiative to rehabilitate him.

Cast
 Pubudu Chathuranga as Sam 
 Dilhani Ekanayake as Nayani 
 Chinthaka Kulathunga as Mahesh
 Buddhi Randeniya as Karuna

International screening
 Busan International Film Festival.
 Asian Film Festival.
Osaka Asian Film Festival.
 5th Delhi International Film Festival - Best Film at the ‘Cinema Across the Borders’ section.

References

External links
 

2021 films
2020s Sinhala-language films
Sri Lankan drama films
2021 drama films